Carolyn MacCuish (born August 29, 1992) is a Canadian figure skater. Competing in pair skating with Andrew Evans, she placed 8th at the 2007 World Junior Championships. She later competed in ice dancing.

Career 
MacCuish competed in pair skating with Andrew Evans from 2006 through 2008. The two were the 2007 Canadian junior national championships, and have competed on the Junior Grand Prix circuit. They trained at the Mariposa School of Skating and were coached by Lee Barkell. MacCuish and Evans placed 8th at the 2007 World Junior Championships. The team placed 2nd at the 2007 JGP USA, but won the free skate.

Their partnership ended in 2008 and MacCuish changed disciplines to ice dancing. She teamed up with Tyler Morris. They are the 2009 Canadian novice national champions.

Competitive highlights

Ice dancing with Morris

Pair skating with Evans

References

External links 

 
 

Canadian female pair skaters
Canadian female ice dancers
1992 births
Living people
Canadian people of Scottish descent
Sportspeople from Burlington, Ontario